The Sound of Zen is a 2002 solo shakuhachi album by Atsuya Okuda.  The album contains recordings of six honkyoku, the music of Japanese Zen monks, played by Okuda.

Okuda has played shakuhachi since 1985 but until this album he refused to record his playing, believing that only live sound leads to an understanding of jinashi shakuhachi. The CD was published by S-Two Corporation.

Tracks
 Honte Shirabe (本手調子), 4:56 
 Tsuru no Sugomori (鶴の巣籠), 9:52 
 Shin Kyorei (真虚霊), 12:03 
 Ôshû Sashi (奥州薩字), 7:40 
 Tamuke (手向), 5:53 
 Kokû (虚空), 17:09 seconds

References

External links
 Okuda Atsuya on the International Shakuhachi Society website

2002 albums
Buddhist music
Zen art and culture